Jesús Roberto Chávez Guzmán (born April 26, 1986, in Torreón) is a former Mexican professional football defender who last played for Dorados de Sinaloa in the Ascenso MX.

He started his career with Tigres, making his league debut for them on 14 October 2006 against city rivals Monterrey. In all he played 43 Primera Division games for Tigres before moving to Jaguares for the Primera División de México Clausura 2009 tournament.

References

External links

1986 births
Living people
Footballers from Coahuila
Mexican footballers
Tigres UANL footballers
Chiapas F.C. footballers
San Luis F.C. players
Club Puebla players
Atlas F.C. footballers
Club Tijuana footballers
Dorados de Sinaloa footballers
Club Necaxa footballers
Association football defenders
Liga MX players
Sportspeople from Torreón